The Communauté de communes Cœur de Berry is a communauté de communes, an intercommunal structure, in the Cher department, in the Centre-Val de Loire region, central France. It was created in January 2017 by the merger of the former communautés de communes Terres d'Yèvre and Vals de Cher et d'Arnon. Its area is 207.8 km2, and its population was 6,874 in 2019. Its seat is in Lury-sur-Arnon.

Communes
The communauté de communes consists of the following 11 communes:

Brinay
Cerbois
Chéry
Lazenay
Limeux
Lury-sur-Arnon
Méreau
Poisieux
Preuilly
Quincy
Sainte-Thorette

References

Coeur de Berry
Coeur de Berry